The Midnight Sun (French: Le soleil de minuit) is a 1943 French adventure film directed by Bernard-Roland and starring Jules Berry, Josseline Gaël and Sessue Hayakawa . It is based on the 1930 novel of the same title by Pierre Benoît. The film's sets were designed by the art director Robert Dumesnil.

Cast
 Jules Berry as 	Forestier
 Josseline Gaël as La princesse Armide Irénieff
 Saturnin Fabre as 	Ireniev
 Sessue Hayakawa as 	Matsui
 Aimé Clariond as 	Grégor
 Marcel Vallée as 	Ivan Barinov
 Alexandre Rignault as 	Tchérensky
 Léon Belières as 	Le directeur de l'usine
 Camille Bert as 	Dumanoir
 Georges Péclet as 	Le capitaine Karovine
 Jean Morel as 	Schmidt
 André Carnège as 	Kouratov
 Georges Paulais as 	Kramer
 Léonce Corne as Le patron du 'Soleil de minuit'
 Marinette Frankel as 	Katia
 Alfred Baillou as 	Le secrétaire
 Henri Charrett as 	Un ingénieur
 Maurice Devienne as 	Un ingénieur
 Ky Duyen as 	Le japonais
 Maurice Picard as 	Un ingénieur
 Jacqueline Pierreux

References

Bibliography
 Goble, Alan. The Complete Index to Literary Sources in Film. Walter de Gruyter, 1999.
 Miyao, Daisuke. Sessue Hayakawa: Silent Cinema and Transnational Stardom. Duke University Press, 2007.

External links 
 

1943 films
French adventure films
1940s French-language films
1943 adventure films
Films directed by Bernard-Roland
Films based on French novels
1940s French films